Ingar Zach (born 29 June 1971 in Oslo, Norway) is a Norwegian percussionist and businessman, known from several recordings.

Career 
In the 1990s Zach played within Chateau Neuf Spelemannslag and 'Harnihomba', while studying music at the University of Oslo (1993) and composition on Jazz program at Trondheim Musikkonsevatorium (1994–97). Within the trio 'Tri-Dim' (1997–2000) he released two albums together with Håkon Kornstad (saxophone) and David Stackenäs (guitar). With the steel guitarist Ivar Grydeland he established the record label Sofa, releasing improvisational music (2000), a collaboration that led to a master's degree in improvisation (2004) and the trio Huntsville including with Tonny Kluften (five albums, 2013).

Zach also collaborated in a duo with free jazz guitarist Derek Bailey (1930–2005), the Norwegian ditto Anders Hana, within the Norwegian trio 'No Spaghetti Edition' (four releases), and in the two orchestras Batagraf and Magnetic North Orchestra led by Jon Balke. In addition Zach has played on releases by Karl Seglem and Carl Petter Opsahl. He lives in Madrid (2004), from which he runs the record label Sillòn of solo albums (subsidiary of Sofa, which is now headed by Grydeland).

Discography

Solo albums 
Within 'Mural' including Kim Myhr and Jim Denley
2010: Nectars of Emergence (Sofa Records)
2011: Live at the Rothko Chapel (Rothko Chapel Productions)

Collaborations 
Duo with Ivar Grydeland
2000: Visiting Ants (Sofa Records)
2004: You Should Have Seen Me Before We First Met (Sofa Records)
2011: Lady Lord (Sofa Records), live as Emo Albino at Kongsberg Jazzfestival

Duo with Derek Bailey
2000: Ilaer (Sofa), live at the Concert Stage Blå

Within No Spaghetti Edition
2001: Listen... And Tell Me What It Was (Sofa Records)
2002: Pasta Variations (Sofa Records)
2003: Real Time Satellite Data (Sofa Records)
2006: Sketches of a Fusion (Sofa Records), featuring Christian Wallumrød

With Philipp Wachsmann, Charlotte Hug and Ivar Grydeland
2002: Wazahugy (Sofa Records)

Within HISS including with Tonny Kluften, Pat Thomas and Ivar Grydeland
2003: Zahir (Rossbin Records)

With Jaap Blonk and Ivar Grydeland
2004: Improvisors (Kontrans Records)

As Ivar Grydeland/Thomas Lehn/Ingar Zach trio
2006: Szc Zcz Cze Zec Eci Cin (Musica Genera)

Within Huntsville trio including with Ivar Grydeland and Tonny Kluften
2006: For The Middle Class (Rune Grammofon)
2008: Eco, Arches & Eras (Rune Grammofon)
2011: For Flowers, Cars And Merry Wars (Hubro Music)
2011: Splashgirl/Huntsville (Hubro Music), together with Splashgirl
2013: Past Increasing, Future Receding  (Hubro Records)

Within Dans Les Arbres including with Ivar Grydeland, Xavier Charles and Christian Wallumrød
2008: Dans Les Arbres (ECM Records)
2012: Canopée (ECM Records)

LabField
2008: Fishforms (Bottrop-Boy)
2010: Collab (Hubro Music)
2014: Bucket Of Song (list of Hubro albums|Hubro Music)

With Arve Henriksen
2013: Places of Worship (Rune Grammofon)

References

External links 

1971 births
Living people
Musicians from Oslo
20th-century Norwegian drummers
21st-century Norwegian drummers
Norwegian jazz drummers
Male drummers
Norwegian percussionists
Norwegian jazz composers
Avant-garde jazz musicians
University of Oslo alumni
Norwegian University of Science and Technology alumni
20th-century drummers
Male jazz composers
20th-century Norwegian male musicians
21st-century Norwegian male musicians
Incus Records artists
Rune Grammofon artists